Diamondhead Lake is an unincorporated community and census-designated place in Penn Township, Guthrie County, Iowa, United States. As of the 2010 census the population was 366.

The CDP consists of a residential community that surrounds Diamondhead Lake, an artificial impoundment just south of the South Raccoon River.

Demographics

References

Census-designated places in Iowa
Populated places in Guthrie County, Iowa